Malakhovo is a rural locality (a selo) in Novoalexandrovskoye Rural Settlement, Suzdalsky District, Vladimir Oblast, Russia. The population was 38 as of 2010. There are 5 streets.

Geography 
Malakhovo is located on the Kolochka River, 41 km southwest of Suzdal (the district's administrative centre) by road. Smolino is the nearest rural locality.

References 

Rural localities in Suzdalsky District